Blepharis grossa is a species of plant in the family Acanthaceae native to Angola, Namibia, and the Cape Provinces.

Taxonomy
It was first described in 1847 by Nees von Esenbeck as Acanthodium grossum. This was revised in 1863 by Thomas Anderson to Blepharis grossa.

References

External links
 Flora of Caprivi (Namibia): Blepharis grossa
 JSTOR Global Plants: Blepharis grossa
 African Plants - A Photo Guide: Blepharis grossa

grossa
Taxa named by Thomas Anderson (botanist)
Plants described in 1847
Flora of Angola
Flora of Namibia
Flora of the Cape Provinces